The actual size and the origin of the undocumented immigrant population in the United States is uncertain and is difficult to ascertain because of difficulty in accurately counting individuals in this population. Figures from national surveys, administrative data and other sources of information vary widely. By all measures, the population of undocumented immigrants in the USA has declined substantially since 2007. The number of border apprehensions has substantially declined since 2000, the peak year, but more than doubled in the most recent fiscal year to approach 2007 levels.

Size

According to the nonpartisan Pew Research Center, the number rose rapidly in the 1990s, "from an estimated 3.5 million in 1990 to a peak of 12.2 million in 2007," then dropped sharply during the Great Recession before stabilizing in 2009. Pew estimated the total population to be 11.1 million in 2014, or approximately 3 percent of the U.S. population. This "is in the same ballpark" as figures from the United States Department of Homeland Security (DHS), which estimated that 11.4 million undocumented immigrants lived in the United States in January 2012. The estimate and trends are also consistent with figures reported by the Center for Migration Studies, which reported that the U.S. illegal immigrant population fell to 10.9 million by January 2016, the lowest number since 2003. A 2018 paper by three Yale School of Management professors estimated that the undocumented immigrant population was in the range of 16 million to 29 million, however the methodology presented in this study has been criticized as leading to vastly overstated results.

Estimation method
The "residual method" is widely used to estimate the undocumented  immigrant population of the US. With this method, the known number of legally documented immigrants to the United States is subtracted from the reported U.S. Census number of self-proclaimed foreign-born people (based on immigration records and adjusted by projections of deaths and out-migration) to obtain the total, undocumented  immigrant (residual) population. This methodology is used by the US Department of Homeland Security, the Pew Hispanic Center, the Center for Immigration Studies, and the U.S. Census Bureau. Since undocumented immigrants have many reasons for not answering the U.S. Census correctly and since penalties for answering the U.S. Census incorrectly are rarely enforced, it is accepted that it under-counts the number of undocumented immigrants. The users of this methodology assume that 10% of undocumented immigrants are not counted by census takers. The 10% assumption is based on a 2001 University of California survey asked of 829 people born in Mexico and living in Los Angeles whether they responded to census interviewers in the 2000 census with 40% of queried households refusing to answer the survey. Critics claim that the estimate is unreliable for a number of reasons: figures for outmigration are not tracked by the federal government; the proportion of undocumented immigrants who respond to the Census is unknown; the estimate that 10% of undocumented immigrants do not respond to the census is arbitrary and unsupported by a sufficient sample size and geographic spread; and that the self reporting of where one was born relies on the honesty of the person being questioned.

In 2016, the Pew Research Center estimated that, in 2014, there were 11.1 million undocumented immigrants in the US. These estimates are based on modeling using data from the American Community Survey (ACS) or the Current Population Survey conducted by the United States Census Bureau each year. 

A 2018 paper by three Yale School of Management professors yielded similar trajectories of the undocumented immigrant population, with peak growth in the 1990s and early 2000s followed by a plateau from approximately 2008 onward. However, their model yielded an estimate of the numbers of undocumented immigrants of 22.1 million undocumented immigrants as the mean — roughly twice as great as the estimates based on the ACS. Moreover, according to the three authors, their estimate has a 95 percent probability range of 16 million to 29 million. That result, however, was criticized for vastly overstating the true number and for failing to account for the circular flow rate.

Impact of the global financial crisis of 2008–2009
The 2008 global financial crisis had a large impact on the United States. The construction sector and other areas where undocumented immigrants traditionally seek employment shrank. The recession also led to a surplus of American labor, driving down the benefit of hiring undocumented immigrants. According to the Pew Research Center, in 2007 the number of unauthorized Mexican immigrants peaked at 6.9 million and has dropped by more than 1 million to an estimated 5.6 million in 2014.

After the Great Recession, more immigrants actually returned to Mexico rather than migrated to the United States.  From 2009 to 2014, 1 million Mexicans and their families left the U.S. for Mexico. U.S. census data for the same period show an estimated 870,000 Mexican nationals left Mexico to return to the U.S. It is hard to track of this because there is no official number of immigrants going to the United States or returning to Mexico every year.

Characteristics

Since about 2014, most undocumented immigrants living in the U.S. have been long-term residents. In 2014, about two-thirds (66%) had been in the U.S. for ten years or more, while just 14% had been in the U.S. for less than five years.

Just as the total population of undocumented  immigrants in the U.S. has declined since 2007, the proportion of undocumented immigrants in the workforce has also declined; in 2012, illegal immigrants made up 5.1% of the U.S.'s civilian labor force. Unauthorized immigrant workers are over-represented in certain economic sectors, making up 26% of farming, fisheries, and forest workers; 17% of cleaning, maintenance, and groundskeeping workers; 14% of construction workers; and 11% of food preparation workers.

Origins
As of 2017, the majority of undocumented immigrants are not Mexicans, with the percentage of illegal immigrants that are Mexican steadily declining over recent years.

The number of Mexican documented and undocumented immigrants in the United States grew quite rapidly over the 35 years between 1970 and 2004; increasing almost 15-fold from about 760,000 in the 1970 Census to more than 11 million in 2004—an average annual growth rate of more than 8 percent, maintained over more than three decades. On average the net Mexican population, both documented and undocumented, living in the United States has grown by about 500,000 per year from 1995 to 2005 with 80 to 85 percent of the growth attributed to unauthorized immigration. There was a net gain of 2,270,000 Mexican immigrants to the US between 1995 and 2000; a net loss of about 20,000 between 2005 and 2010; and a net loss of 140,000 between 2009 and 2014.

The total number of Mexicans residing in the US, with and without authorization, was 11.7 million in 2014, down from the peak of 12.8 million in 2007. The drop is primarily the result of the decrease in the number of unauthorized migrants—which make up 48% of the Mexican population in the US in 2014, down from 54% in 2007.

2014 status 
 Out of the entire workforce in the United States, 8 million were undocumented immigrants. This number includes immigrants who either found work illegally or are working in people's households under their order. Five percent of those immigrants were unemployed and looking for work.
 Mexicans made up 52% of all undocumented immigrants in 2014. There were 5.8 million Mexican undocumented immigrants living in the U.S. that year, down from 6.4 million in 2009, according to the latest Pew Research Center estimates.
 California, Texas, Florida, New York, New Jersey and Illinois accounted for 59% of undocumented immigrants in 2014.

See also 
 Illegal immigration to the United States
 Office of Victims of Immigration Crime Engagement

References 
Specific

External links 
Unauthorized Immigrant Population National and State Trends

Illegal immigration to the United States
Hispanic and Latino demographics in the United States